Narayan Shukla (born 18 July 1958)  also known as SN Shukla was an Allahabad High Court Judge. The Chief Justice of India Dipak Misra has written to the President of India recommending his removal for his alleged involvement in the medical college admission scam.
 
In January 2018, a three-judge in-house committee found that here was sufficient substance in the allegations  against Justice Shukla and the irregularities were serious enough to call for initiation of proceedings for his removal. Subsequently, the then Chief Justice of India, Dipak Mishra asked him to either resign or seek voluntary retirement. After Justice Shukla refused to do so, Dipak Mishra had asked the Chief Justice of Allahabad High Court to not assign him judicial work.

Justice Shukla has retired on 17 July 2020. Judges of high court hold office until they attain the age of 62 years.

References 

1958 births
20th-century Indian judges
21st-century Indian judges
Living people
Judges of the Allahabad High Court